RNLB J C Madge (ON 536) was a Liverpool-class, Pulling and Sailing non-self righting lifeboat stationed at Sheringham in the English county of Norfolk from December 1904 until June 1936 during which time she was launched on service 34 times and saved 58 lives.

Design and construction
J C Madge was built at the Thames Ironworks and Shipbuilding Company in Blackwall in 1903 at the cost of  £1,436 16s 6d. She was paid for from a legacy of £2,000 left to the RNLI by a Mr James C Madge, a chemist, of Southampton. The design was a Liverpool class, non-self righting, pulling and sailing lifeboat. The boat was built using the Clinker method of constructing hulls.

The boat was fitted with two sliding or drop-keels and two water-ballast tanks. The lifeboat had two masts of which the fore-mast carried a dipping lug sail and the mizzen mast a standing lug sail. The boat had two drop keels and was fitted out with water ballast tanks. She pulled 16 oars which were double banked for heavy weather. Her Launching carriage was built by the Bristol Wagon & Carriage Works Company, which was delivered separately by rail to Sheringham. This carriage was constructed with larger front wheels installed with a series of flat metal plates around circumference of each wheel. Their purpose was to help prevent the boat sinking into areas of soft sand.

Heavy ropes were attached to the carriage, and a team of 30 or more men would haul her into the waves at launch times. She was then rowed out through the surf, but if this was not possible then the lifeboat was pulled out to sea using a haul-off warp (a windlass), by use of a thick rope anchored some 200 metres off shore and fixed at the beach end to a post by the lifeboat house. There was a large manually operated winch situated at the back of the boathouse to assist in recovering the boat after launch.

Delivery
The J C Madge left the yard of the Thames Ironworks and Shipbuilding Company on 30 November 1904, crewed by the Coxswain William "Click" Bishop and six crewmen. She was sailed around the east coast from the Blackwall yard in fair weather, with overnight stops at Harwich and Great Yarmouth, arriving in Sheringham on 2 December 1904. When she arrived at Sheringham she was housed in a new purpose built lifeboat shed at Old Hythe which was a mile west of Sheringham. The new lifeboat was inaugurated on 13 December 1904 at a ceremony at Old Hythe were J C Madge was christened by the daughter of the president of the local RNLI Branch Mr H R Upcher. JP.

Service
The Lifeboat J C Madge was on station at Old Hythe, Sheringham for 30 years and she was launched a total of 34 times and she is credited with saving 58 lives. The first service was on 6 January to the Barge Gothic and Teutonic, both of London. The crews were removed and landed in Sheringham and later the J C Madge and the fisherman's lifeboat Henry Ramey Upcher towed both barges to Great Yarmouth.

SS Uller
One notable service was to the steamship SS Uller of Bergen on 24 February 1916. The steamship was bound for La Pallice from Sunderland with a cargo of coal and had foundered on a Dudgeon sands. Amid heavy snow storms and gale-force winds the J C Madge stood by her all night in appalling conditions. In the morning the lifeboat escorted SS Uller to the Humber Estuary fifty-three miles away.

The last service by J C Madge was to the Sheringham fishing boat Little Madge on 2 April 1936. Little Madge had got into difficulties and the lifeboat had taken off her crew of two and taken her in to tow, only for both vessels to be towed to safety by the Cromer Lifeboat .

Retirement
After her retirement from service at Sheringham, Lifeboat J C Madge  was replaced by the Foresters Centenary. The lifeboat remained at Sheringham for over a month before being sold out of service for £80 to W Gillard of Wembley, Middlesex. She was converted into a private pleasure craft with a cabin added. The boat was used around the coast of Norfolk and Lincolnshire for many years. In 1988 J C Madge was displayed at the Sheringham stations annual lifeboat Day. Following her appearance there, £30,000 was raised and she was repurchased for restoration in 1989 by the Sheringham Museum Trust. In the summer of 1989 the J C Madge was sailed from Brancaster around the coast to the Lowestoft international boatbuilding college at Oulton Broad where she was restored to her former lifeboat appearance and use. On 14 August 1999 the National Historic Ships Committee added the J C Madge to the National Register of Historic Vessels (Certificate no 1763). From March 2010 she is on permanent display at the new Sheringham Museum

Coxswains of the J C Madge 
Whilst J C Madge was on station at Sheringham there were three Coxswains:
 William 'Click' Bishop, 1904 to 1914
 Obadiah Craske Cooper, 1914 to 1924
 James Edward Dumble, 1924 to 1936

Service and rescues of J C Madge

The lifeboat displayed at Sheringham Museum

References

J C Madge
Sheringham lifeboats
1904 ships
Liverpool-class lifeboats
Ships and vessels on the National Register of Historic Vessels